Pterinopelma sazimai is a species of tarantula and is known as the Brazilian blue, Iridescent Blue or Sazima's Tarantula. It was first described by Rogério Bertani, Roberto Hiroaki Nagahama and Caroline Sayuri Fukushima in 2011. In 2012, it became the first Brazilian species to appear on the International Institute for Species Exploration's Top 10 New Species list. Its name honors Ivan Sazima, a Brazilian zoologist who was the first to collect exemplars of the species. It is now considered an endangered species owing to smuggling and a shrinking habitat.

Description 
Their life expectancy is not known. All of its body is iridescent blue in color, with the exception of the opisthosoma, which may be blue covered in reddish hairs, though some lack this reddish hairs. The tarantula may also be darker or brighter in color, depending on several factors.

Habitat 
This species is native to an ecological island within the Chapada Diamantina National Park in Bahia, Brazil. It has average temperaturs of 20 °C, with yearly precipitation being an average of 1000mm. It is home to plants such as bromeliads, orchids, and animals such as ocelots, Rock cavys, and Teius teyou.

Behavior 
They are opportunistic burrowers, though they spend most of their time in said burrows. If bothered they will bolt to their burrows, though if this is not possible, they will not hesitate to throw urticating hairs, or make a threat pose.

References 

Theraphosidae
Spiders described in 2011
Spiders of Brazil